The hook-nosed blind snake (Ramphotyphlops multilineatus) is a species of snake in the Typhlopidae family.

References

Ramphotyphlops
Reptiles described in 1839